Rinawa is a genus of South Pacific dwarf sheet spiders that was first described by Raymond Robert Forster in 1970.

Species
 it contains four species, all found in New Zealand:
Rinawa bola Forster, 1970 – New Zealand
Rinawa cantuaria Forster, 1970 – New Zealand
Rinawa otagoensis Forster, 1970 (type) – New Zealand
Rinawa pula Forster, 1970 – New Zealand

References

Araneomorphae genera
Hahniidae
Spiders of New Zealand
Taxa named by Raymond Robert Forster